The 1980–81 Auburn Tigers men's basketball team represented Auburn University in the 1980-81 college basketball season. The team was coached by Sonny Smith, who was in his third season.

Newcomers to the team this season included freshman signees Greg Turner, Mark Cahill, and Paul Daniels.  The team lost captains Bubba Price and Rich Valavicius, who graduated.

The team played their home games at Memorial Coliseum in Auburn, Alabama. They finished the season 9–16, 4–14 in SEC play. They lost to Florida in the first round of the 1980-81 SEC Men's Basketball Tournament.

Roster

References

Auburn Tigers men's basketball seasons
Auburn
Auburn Tigers
Auburn Tigers